The following is an episode list for the television show Romeo!.

Series overview

<onlyinclude>

Episodes

Season 1 (2003–04)

Season 2 (2004–05)

Season 3 (2006)

External links
 
 Nickandmore! Romeo Episode Lists, and Production Codes

Lists of American children's television series episodes
Lists of Canadian children's television series episodes
Lists of American comedy television series episodes
Lists of Canadian comedy television series episodes
Lists of American sitcom episodes
Lists of Canadian sitcom episodes
Lists of Nickelodeon television series episodes